Jonathan Hoefler (born 1970) is an American type designer. Hoefler founded the Hoefler Type Foundry in 1989, a type foundry in New York.

Early life 
Jonathan Hoefler was born on August 22, 1970, in New York City to Doreen Benjamin and Charles Hoefler, a theatrical set designer and producer. Growing up, it was the Gill Sans text on boxes of custard that drew him to typography design. He is largely self-taught, and worked with magazine art director Roger Black prior to forming the Hoefler Type Foundry in 1989.

Career 
Hoefler's Champion Gothic was inspired by 19th-century wood type. It was commissioned for Sports Illustrated shortly after founding the company in 1989. In 1997, his path crossed with type designer Tobias Frere-Jones when both were trying to purchase German type foundry catalogs. In 1999, Hoefler began working with Frere-Jones, and from 2005 to 2014 the company operated under the name Hoefler & Frere-Jones as a partnership. In 2000, the firm, under Frere-Jones' direction, designed its ubiquitous Gotham typeface for GQ magazine and received wide recognition for their work and in the last 20 years is one of the most successful typefaces.

Hoefler's process when designing typefaces begins with research into historical records and then utilize the programming language Python to automate repetitive tasks. Their typefaces are systematic and logical and incorporate specific features based on their research. Hoefler has designed original typefaces for Rolling Stone, Harper’s Bazaar, The New York Times Magazine, Sports Illustrated, and Esquire and several institutional clients, including the Solomon R. Guggenheim Museum and alternative band They Might Be Giants. Perhaps his best-known work is the Hoefler Text family of typefaces, designed for Apple Computer and now appearing as part of the Macintosh operating system. He also designed the current wordmark of the Church of Jesus Christ of Latter-day Saints.

In January 2014, Frere-Jones sued Hoefler for $20 million in the New York Supreme Court accusing him of scamming Frere-Jones. Frere-Jones claimed that in 1999, Hoefler agreed to a verbal 50–50 partnership that was legally binding. In light of the lawsuit, Hoefler changed the name back to Hoefler & Co claiming Frere-Jones had only been an employee, citing an agreement that they were not partners but “independent entities" and asked the court to dismiss the case. Fans of the foundry were shocked by the news of the lawsuit. A settlement was subsequently filed in September 2014.

On September 15, 2021, Monotype announced the acquisition of Hoefler & Co. and its font assets. Jonathan Hoefler also announced his intention to retire from the company.

Awards and recognition 
In 1995, Hoefler was named one of the forty most influential designers in America by I.D. magazine, and in 2002, the Association Typographique Internationale (ATypI) presented him with its most prestigious award, the Prix Charles Peignot for outstanding contributions to type design.

Hoefler's work is part of the Cooper-Hewitt, National Design Museum's permanent collection. In 2011, the Museum of Modern Art acquired two of Hoefler's typefaces: Mercury, and HTF Didot.

In 2013, Hoefler and Frere-Jones were awarded the AIGA Medal for "their contributions to the typographic landscape through impeccable craftsmanship, skilled historical reference and insightful vernacular considerations."

Typefaces
Jonathan Hoefler's typefaces include:

Gestalt, 1990
Champion Gothic, 1990
Hoefler Text, 1991
Ideal Sans, 1991
Ziggurat, 1991
Leviathan, 1991
Mazarin, 1991
HTF Didot, 1992
Requiem Text, 1992
Saracen, 1992
Acropolis, 1993
NYT Cheltenham, 1993
Knox, 1993
Historical Allsorts, 1994
Knockout, 1994
Fetish, 1994
Neutrino, 1994
Quantico, 1994
Oratorio, 1994
Troubadour, 1994
William Maxwell, 1994
Deseret, 1995
Jupiter, 1995
Pavisse, 1995
Verlag (formerly Guggenheim), 1996
Giant (formerly They Might Be Gothic), 1996
New Amsterdam, 1996
Hoefler Titling, 1996
Plainsong, 1996
Kapellmeister, 1997
Numbers (with Tobias Frere-Jones), 1997–2006
Mercury, (with Tobias Frere-Jones), 1997
Radio City, 1998
Vitesse, (with Tobias Frere-Jones), 2000
Deluxe, 2000
Cyclone, 2000
Topaz, 2000
Lever Sans, (with Tobias Frere-Jones), 2000
Archer, (with Tobias Frere-Jones), 2001
Chronicle, (with Tobias Frere-Jones), 2002
Sentinel, (with Tobias Frere-Jones), 2002
Operator, (with Andy Clymer), 2016
Inkwell, (with Jordan Bell), 2017
Decimal, 2019
Sentinel Ornaments (an extension of Sentinel), 2021
Sagittarius, 2021

References

Footnotes

General references
HoeflerCo.
Friedl, Frederich, Nicholas Ott and Bernard Stein. Typography: An Encyclopedic Survey of Type Design and Techniques Through History. Black Dog & Leventhal: 1998. .
Macmillan, Neil. An A–Z of Type Designers. Yale University Press: 2006. .
“The I.D. Forty,” I.D. magazine, Jan/Feb 1995.

American typographers and type designers
1970 births
Living people
American graphic designers
AIGA medalists